The 2nd Okinawa International Movie Festival was held from March 20 to March 28, 2010, and took place at the Okinawa Convention Center in Ginowan City and Sakurazaka Theater in Naha, owned and run by Japanese director Yuji Nakae. Attendance was recorded as 380,000, with 194 official guests.  The Golden Shisa was awarded to Taku Watanabe for his Miss Kurosawa Film.

Japanese J-Pop singer Namie Amuro was a special guest on the Okinawa International Movie Festival red carpet on March 24. Other guests included Korean actor Kang Ji-hwan, Chinese director Ing Sheng, Korean-American actor Steve Seungjun Yoo, Taiwanese Director Fu Tien-Yu and Adisorn Tresirikasern, a director from Thailand.

Official selection
The official selection of films was broken into two categories, "Laugh" and "Peace". The former focuses on comedy films, while the latter includes dramas and documentaries with elements of comedy.

Competition

Laugh Category
The following films were selected as In Competition for the Laugh Category:

Peace Category
The following films were selected as In Competition for the Peace Category:

Out of Competition
The following films were screened out of competition:
"Special Screening Feature on Okinawa Movie"

Jury

Competition
 Kim Dong Ho, Executive Chairman of Pusan International Film Festival
 Lee Chi Ngai, Hong Kong director
 Lee Khan, Taiwanese filmmaker
 Christoph Terhecte, Director International Forum of New Cinema Berlin
 Eiki Matayoshi, Japanese novelist

Awards

Official selection
In Competition
The Golden Shisa Award was won by the Japanese-language film Miss Kurosawa Film directed by Taku Watanabe.

The Laugh Category Uminchu Prize Grand Prix went to Miss Kurosawa Film directed by Taku Watanabe.

The Peace Category Uminchu Prize Grand Prix was won by Indian film A Match Made in Heaven by Aditya Chopra.

See also
 Okinawa International Movie Festival

References

External links
 Okinawa International Movie Festival official website (in English)
 Official Okinawa International Movie Festival Facebook Page

Film festivals in Japan
March 2010 events in Japan
2010 film festivals
2010 festivals in Asia
2010 in Japanese cinema

ja:沖縄国際映画祭